was a Japanese actor, voice actor and narrator. He was most known for the roles of Captain Hook (Peter Pan no Bōken & Disney's Peter Pan), Dick Dastardly (Wacky Races & Dastardly and Muttley in Their Flying Machines), Goemon Ishikawa XIII (Lupin III), Nezumi Otoko (GeGeGe no Kitaro), Denzō Yamada (Nintama Rantarō), Professor Moriarty (Sherlock Hound), Jagi (Fist of the North Star), Doctor Eggman (Sonic the Hedgehog series), Gol D. Roger (One Piece), Xehanort (Kingdom Hearts series), Dr. Weil (Mega Man Zero), Taopaipai (Dragon Ball), Piedmon and Apocalymon (Digimon), and Wario in his commercials. He was the official dubbing artist of Charles Bronson and Richard Widmark. At the time of his death, he was attached with Aoni Production.

He was the father of Akio Ōtsuka. The two occasionally performed together, such as in Black Jack 21, Mobile Suit Gundam 0083 Stardust Memory, the Kingdom Hearts series, the Full Metal Panic! series, and Metal Gear Solid 4: Guns of the Patriots.

Ohtsuka died from ischemic heart failure at the age of 85 on January 15, 2015.

Filmography

Television drama
 Minamoto no Yoshitsune (1966) (Fujiwara no Tadakiyo)
 Tokugawa Ieyasu (1983) (Natsume Harusada)
 Sanga Moyu (1984) (Tazawa)
 Kitaro ga Mita Gyokusai - Mizuki Shigeru no Senso (2007) (Nezumi Otoko's voice)

Television animation
1960s
 Astro Boy (1963) (President Hira, Nubo)
 Gegege no Kitaro (1968) (Nezumi-Otoko)
1970s
 Ashita no Joe (1971) (Goromaki Gondō)
 Gegege no Kitaro (1971) (Nezumi-Otoko)
 Lupin III (1971) (Goemon Ishikawa XIII)
 Babel II (1973) (Yomi)
 Gamba no Bōken (1975) (Noroi)
1980s
 King Arthur: Prince on White Horse (1980) (Bossman)
 Sherlock Hound (1984) (Professor Moriarty)
 Dragon Ball (1987) (Taopaipai)
 Akakage (1987) (Koga)
 Oishinbo (1988) (Yūzan Kaibara)
 Peter Pan no Bōken (1989) (Captain Hook)
1990s
 Moomin (Stinky)
 Nintama Rantarō (1993) (Denzō Yamada)
 Kindaichi Case Files (1996) (Keitaro Kiyomasa)
 Cowboy Bebop (1998) (Doctor Londes)
 Master Keaton (1998) (Andre Semonofu)
 Yu-Gi-Oh! (1998) (LeDolly Sheldon)
 Digimon Adventure (1999) (Piedmon, Apocalymon)
 Kamikaze Kaito Jeanne (1999) (Police Chief Mikuri)
 One Piece (1999) (Gol D. Roger) (2021 - archiv record, episode 1000)
2000s
 Beyblade series (2000-2003) (Ryūnosuke Kinomiya)
 Najica Blitz Tactics (2001) (Ricardo Caidell)
 Vandread (2001) (Jin)
 The Galaxy Railways (2003) (Station Master Arvent)
 Hellsing (2003) (Arthur Hellsing ((tenth episode))
 Rumic Theater (2003) (Domoto)
 Sonic X (2003) (Doctor Eggman, Professor Gerald Robotnik)
 Wolf's Rain (2003) (Shopkeeper)
 Area 88 (2004) (Grandfather McCoy)
 Gokusen (2004) (Yakuza Boss Ryūichirō Kuroda)
 Full Metal Panic!: The Second Raid (2005) (Lord Mallory)
 Monster (2005) (Mikhail Ivanovich Petrov)
 The Law of Ueki (2005-2006) (Ogre)
 Tsubasa: Reservoir Chronicle (2005-2006) (Tanbaru)
 Ayakashi (2006) (Yoshiyuki Sakai)
 Spider Riders (2006) (Braid)
 Mobile Suit Gundam 00 (2007) (Aeolia Schenberg)
 El Cazador de la Bruja (2007) (Enrike)
 Les Misérables: Shōjo Cosette (2007) (Bishop Myriel)
 Hakaba Kitaro (2008) (Nezumi-Otoko)
 Slayers Revolution (2008) (Pirate Captain)
2010s
 Nurarihyon no Mago (2010) (Nurarihyon)
 Nurarihyon no Mago: Sennen Makyou (2011) (Nurarihyon)
 Future Card Buddyfight (2014) (Drum Bunker Dragon Father)

OVA
 Area 88 (1985-1986) (Nguyen Van Chom)
 Armored Trooper Votoms (1985) (Yoran Pailsen)
 Legend of the Galactic Heroes (1988) (Rudolf von Goldenbaum)
 Mobile Suit Gundam 0083: Stardust Memory (1991) (Eiphar Synapse)
 Ushio and Tora (1992) (Tora)
 JoJo's Bizarre Adventure (1993) (Joseph Joestar)
 Black Jack (1993) (Crossword)
 Ruin Explorers (1995) (Galf)
 Bio Hunter (1995) (Bokuda)
 Hellsing Ultimate (2006) (Abraham Van Helsing)

Theatrical animation
 Do It! Yasuji's Pornorama (1971) (Manager)
 Phoenix 2772 (1980) (Ban)
 Night on the Galactic Railroad (1985) (Birdcatcher)
 Arion (1986) (Hades)
 Dragon Ball: Mystical Adventure (1988) (Tao Pai Pai)
 Little Nemo: Adventures in Slumberland (1989) (Flip)
 Bonobono (1993) (Araiguma-kun's father)
 Pokémon: The Movie 2000 (1999) (Tobias)
 Crayon Shin-chan: The Storm Called: The Kasukabe Boys of the Evening Sun (2004) (O'Reilly)
 Doraemon: Nobita and the Green Giant Legend (2008) (Shiraa)

Video games

 Asura's Wrath (Kalrow)
 BS Super Mario USA Power Challenge (King)
 Bushido Blade (Utsusemi)
 Dead or Alive: Dimensions (Gen Fu)
 Dead or Alive 5 Ultimate (Gen Fu)
 Dead or Alive 5 Last Round (Gen Fu)
 Dragon Ball Z: Budokai Tenkaichi series (Taopaipai)
 Excitebike: Bun Bun Mario Battle Stadium (Wario)
 Granblue Fantasy (Altheia)
 Kingdom Hearts: Chain of Memories (Captain Hook)
 Kingdom Hearts Re: Chain of Memories (Captain Hook)
 Mega Man Zero 4 (Doctor Weil)
 Metal Gear Solid 4: Guns of the Patriots (Big Boss)
 No More Heroes: Heroes' Paradise (Dr. Peace)
 Shining Force EXA (Gantetsu)
 Sonic the Hedgehog series (Doctor Eggman, Gerald Robotnik)
 Tales of Xillia 2 (Maxwell)
 Tech Romancer (Goldibus)
 Tekken 5/Dark Resurrection (Jinpachi Mishima, Scientist in Ling Xiaoyu's Ending)
 Tekken Revolution (Jinpachi Mishima)
 Tekken Tag Tournament 2 (Jinpachi Mishima)
 Tekken Tag Tournament 2 Unlimited (Jinpachi Mishima)
 Tekken Tag Tournament 2: Wii U Edition (Jinpachi Mishima)
 Tenchu: Wrath of Heaven (Tenrai)

Commercials
 Coca-Cola Oolong (Narration)
 Hitachi, Ltd. Fax
 Nippon Telegraph and Telephone
 Sony Ericsson SO702i mobile phone (Narration)
 Super Mario Land 2: 6 Golden Coins (Wario)
 Wario (Wario)

Dubbing roles

Live-action
Charles Bronson
 Vera Cruz (Pittsburgh)
 The Magnificent Seven (1974 TV Asahi edition) (Bernardo O'Reilly)
 A Thunder of Drums (TBS edition) (Trooper Hanna)
 Kid Galahad (Lew Nyack)
 The Great Escape (1971 Fuji TV edition) (Danny Tunnel King)
 Battle of the Bulge (1973 TV Asahi and 1978 Fuji TV editions) (Maj. Wolenski)
 Combat! (Velasquez)
 The Sandpiper (Cos Erickson)
 This Property Is Condemned (1975 Nippon Television edition) (J.J. Nichols)
 Adieu l'ami (Fuji TV edition) (Franz Propp)
 La Bataille de San Sebastian (Teclo)
 Once Upon a Time in the West (Harmonica)
 Villa Rides (Fuji TV edition) (Rodolfo Fierro)
 Lola (Scott Wardman)
 Violent City (1974 TV Asahi and 1985 TBS editions) (Jeff Heston)
 Cold Sweat (1979 NTV edition) (Joe Martin)
 Rider on the Rain (1977 Nippon Television edition) (Dobbs)
 You Can't Win 'Em All (Fuji TV edition) (Josh Corey)
 Red Sun (TV Tokyo edition) (Link Stuart)
 The Valachi Papers (Nippon Television and TV Asahi edition) (Joe Valachi)
 Chino (1979 TV Asahi edition) (Chino Valdez)
 The Stone Killer (TV Asahi edition) (Lou Torrey)
 Death Wish (1980 TV Asahi edition) (Paul Kersey)
 Breakheart Pass (Deakin)
 Breakout (1981 TV Asahi edition) (Nick Colton)
 Hard Times (1981 TV Asahi edition) (Chaney)
 St. Ives (TV Asahi and Fuji TV editions) (St. Ives)
 Raid on Entebbe (1989 Fuji TV edition) (Brig. Gen Dan Shomron)
 Telefon (Bortsov)
 Borderline (TV Tokyo edition) (Jeb Maynard)
 Death Wish II (Nippon Television and TV Asahi editions) (Paul Kersey)
 10 to Midnight (1985 TV Asahi edition) (Leo Kessler)
 The Evil That Men Do (Holland / Bart Smith)
 Death Wish 3 (1988 TV Asahi edition) (Paul Kersey)
 Murphy's Law (Fuji TV edition) (Murphy)
 Death Wish 4: The Crackdown (1991 TV Asahi edition) (Paul Kersey)
 Messenger of Death (TV Asahi edition) (Garret Smith)
 Death Wish V: The Face of Death (1996 TV Tokyo edition) (Paul Kersey)
 A Family of Cops (Paul Fein)
 Family of Cops 3 (Paul Fein)
Richard Widmark
 Kiss of Death (Fuji TV edition) (Tommy Udo)
 The Street with No Name (1969 TV Asashi edition) (Alec Stiles)
 Yellow Sky (Dude)
 Panic in the Streets (1970 TV Asashi edition) (Lt. Cmdr. "Clint" Reed M.D.)
 Night and the City (Harry Fabian)
 The Frogmen (Lt. Cmdr. John Lawrence)
 Halls of Montezuma (1970 TBS and 1974 Fuji TV editions) (Lt. Anderson)
 Don't Bother to Knock (Jed Towers)
 Red Skies of Montana (1970 TBS edition) (Cliff Mason)
 Destination Gobi (CPO Samuel T. McHale)
 Take the High Ground! (Sgt. Thorne Ryan)
 Broken Lance (1969 TV Asashi edition) (Ben Devereaux)
 Garden of Evil (1969 TV Asashi edition) (Fiske)
 Hell and High Water (1969 TBS edition) (Adam Jones)
 The Cobweb (Dr. Stewart McIver)
 A Prize of Gold (1969 TBS edition) (Sergeant Joe Lawrence)
 The Last Wagon (1963 Nippon TV and 1973 Fuji TV editions) (Comanche Todd)
 Run for the Sun (1967 TV Asashi and 1973 TBS editions) (Michael Latimer)
 The Law and Jake Wade (Clint Hollister)
 The Tunnel of Love (1972 TV Tokyo edition) (August 'Augie' Poole)
 The Trap (Ralph Anderson)
 Warlock (1969 and 1980 TV Asashi editions) (Johnny Gannon)
 The Alamo (TBS edition) (Jim Bowie)
 Judgment at Nuremberg (Col. Tad Lawson)
 The Secret Ways (Michael Reynolds)
 Two Rode Together (First Lieutenant Jim Gary)
 Cheyenne Autumn (Captain Thomas Archer)
 Flight from Ashiya (L:t. Col. Glenn Stevenson)
 The Long Ships (Rolfe)
 The Bedford Incident (Captain Eric Finlander U.S.N.)
 Alvarez Kelly (1973 TV Asashi edition) (Colonel Tom Rossiter)
 The Way West (Lije Evans)
 Madigan (1978 TV Asashi edition (Det. Daniel Madigan))
 Death of a Gunfighter (1974 Fuji TV edition) (Frank Patch)
 A Talent for Loving (TV Tokyo edition) (Major Patten)
 The Moonshine War (TV Tokyo edition) (Dr. Taulbee)
 When the Legends Die (TBS edition) (Red Dillon)
 Brock's Last Case (Lieutenant Max Brock)
 Murder on the Orient Express (Mr. Ratchett)
 The Last Day (NHK edition) (Will Spence)
 The Sell Out (TV Asashi edition) (Sam Lucas)
 To the Devil a Daughter (John Verney)
 The Domino Principle (Tagge)
 Twilight's Last Gleaming (1979 TV Tokyo edition) (Gen. Martin MacKenzie)
 Coma (Dr. George Harris)
 The Swarm (General Thaddeus Slater)
 Bear Island (1985 TV Asashi edition) (Otto Gerran)
 Hanky Panky (Ransom)
 Who Dares Wins (Secretary of State Arthur Currie)
 Against All Odds (1987 Fuji TV edition) (Ben Caxton)
 True Colors (Sen. James Stiles)

Jack Palance
 Attack (Lt. Joe Costa)
 Contempt (Jeremy Prokosch)
 Kill a Dragon (Rick Masters)
 They Came to Rob Las Vegas (Douglas)
 Young Guns (Lawrence Murphy)
 Batman (1995 TV Asashi edition) (Carl Grissom)
 Tango & Cash (1993 TV Asashi edition) (Yves Perret)
 Solar Crisis (Travis)
 City Slickers (Curly Washburn)
 City Slickers II: The Legend of Curly's Gold (Duke Washburn)
 Cops & Robbersons (Jake Stone)
Chuck Connors
 The Big Country (Buck Hannassey)
 Soylent Green (Fielding)
 99 and 44/100% Dead (Marvin 'Claw' Zuckerman)
 Tourist Trap (Mr. Slausen)
 Virus (Captain McCloud)

Peter Sellers
 Lolita (Clare Quilty)
 Dr. Strangelove (TV edition) (Dr. Strangelove)
 The Pink Panther (1973 TV Asashi edition) (Inspector Jacques Clouseau)
 A Shot in the Dark (1970 TV Asashi edition) (Jacques Clouseau)
 The World of Henry Orient (Henry Orient)

R. Lee Ermey
 Leaving Las Vegas (Conventioneer)
 Seven (Police Captain)
 The Texas Chainsaw Massacre (Sheriff Hoyt)
 The Texas Chainsaw Massacre: The Beginning (Sheriff Hoyt)
Others
 12 Angry Men (Juror #7 (Jack Warden))
 The Addams Family (Lurch (Ted Cassidy)
 Addams Family Reunion (Lurch (Carel Struycken)
 ALF (Trevor Ochmonek (John LaMotta))
 Batman (TV series) (Penguin (Burgess Meredith))
 Beverly Hills Cop (1988 TV Asahi edition) (Sergeant John Taggart (John Ashton))
 The Big Brawl (Herbert (Mako))
 The Big Lebowski (Blu-Ray edition) (The Stranger (Sam Elliott))
 Blade (2001 TV Tokyo edition) (Abraham Whistler (Kris Kristofferson))
 The Bourne Ultimatum (Dr. Albert Hirsch (Albert Finney))
 Children of Men (Jasper Palmer (Michael Caine))
 A Christmas Carol (Ebeneezer Scrooge (Patrick Stewart))
 Contact (S.R. Hadden (John Hurt))
 Cop Land (Ray Donlan (Harvey Keitel))
 Creepshow 2 (The Creep (Tom Savini / Joe Silver))
 The Dark Crystal (SkekUng (Michael Kilgarriff) (puppeteered by (Dave Goelz))
 Doomsday (Bill Nelson (Bob Hoskins))
 Downfall (Adolf Hitler (Bruno Ganz))
 Dragon Lord (Dragon's Father (Tien Feng))
 Fire Down Below (2000 TV Asahi edition) (Orin Hanner, Sr. (Kris Kristofferson))
 From Dusk till Dawn (Jacob Fuller (Harvey Keitel))
 The Great Silence (1972 TV Asahi edition) (Loco (Klaus Kinski))
 The Good, the Bad and the Ugly (Tuco (Eli Wallach))
 Jack Reacher (The Zec (Werner Herzog))
 Kolchak: The Night Stalker (Carl Kolchak (Darren McGavin))
 Lincoln (Abraham Lincoln (Daniel Day-Lewis))
 Little Nicky (Satan (Harvey Keitel))
 Look at Me (Étienne Cassard (Jean-Pierre Bacri))
 Mad Max Beyond Thunderdome (1988 Fuji TV edition) (Dr. Dealgood (Edwin Hodgeman))
 Masters of the Universe (1992 TV Asahi edition) (Skeletor (Frank Langella))
 Memories of Murder (Sergeant Koo Hee-bong (Byun Hee-bong))
 The Mummy (Dr. Allan Chamberlain (Jonathan Hyde))
 One Armed Boxer (Chao Liu)
 The Pink Panther (Inspector Clouseau (Peter Sellers))
 The Plague of the Zombies (Squire Clive Hamilton (John Carson))
 The Quiet American (Thomas Fowler (Michael Caine))
 The Score (Max (Marlon Brando))
 Secondhand Lions (TV edition) (Hub (Robert Duvall))
 Snow White and the Huntsman (Muir (Bob Hoskins))
 Snowpiercer (Gilliam (John Hurt))
 Space Cowboys (Tank Sullivan (James Garner))
 The Spy Who Loved Me (TBS Version 2) (Karl Stromberg (Curd Jürgens)
 The Storyteller (The Storyteller (John Hurt)
 Texas, Adios (Cisco Delgado (José Suarez))
 Turbulence (Aldo Hines (Héctor Elizondo))
 Wall Street: Money Never Sleeps (Julius "Julie" Steinhardt (Eli Wallach))
 The Young Victoria (King William IV (Jim Broadbent))

Animation
 The Adventures of Ichabod and Mr. Toad (Winkie)
 Alice in Wonderland (The Cheshire Cat)
 The Black Cauldron (The Creeper)
 Dastardly and Muttley in Their Flying Machines (Dick Dastardly)
 The Fox and the Hound (Amos Slade)
 The Fox and the Hound 2 (Amos Slade)
 The Great Mouse Detective (Fidget)
 Mulan (Fa Zhou)
 Mulan II (Fa Zhou)
 Peter Pan (Captain Hook)
 Pinocchio (Stromboli)
 Toy Story series (Hamm)
 Wacky Races (Dick Dastardly)
 Yellow Submarine (Chief Blue Meanie)

References

External links
 Official agency profile 
 
 
 

1929 births
2015 deaths
Aoni Production voice actors
Japanese male musical theatre actors
Japanese male video game actors
Japanese male voice actors
Male voice actors from Tokyo
20th-century Japanese male actors
21st-century Japanese male actors